Constantin Moldoveanu (25 October 1943 – 10 September 2013) was a Romanian football forward, manager and referee.

Club career
Constantin Moldoveanu was born on 25 October 1943 in Ploiești, Romania and started to play football in 1958 at the junior squads of CSMS Iași, returning in 1961 in Ploiești to play for Petrolul where on 19 August 1962 he made his Divizia A debut under coach Ilie Oană in a 0–0 against Progresul București. He scored two goals in a 6–1 victory against Siderurgistul Galați in the 1963 Cupa României final which helped Petrolul Ploiești win the first Cupa României in the club's history. In 1964 he went to play for a half of season at Steaua București, afterwards returning at Petrolul. In his second period spent with The Yellow Wolves, he helped the team win the 1965–66 Divizia A title, being used by coach Constantin Cernăianu in 24 matches in which he scored 8 goals, he also played three games in the first round of the 1966–67 European Cup against Liverpool which include a 3–1 victory in which he scored a goal, however they did not manage to qualify to the next round. In 1969 he went to play for Politehnica Iași where in the 1970–71 Divizia A season he scored 15 goals, being the top-goalscorer of the league alongside Florea Dumitrache and Gheorghe Tătaru. In 1972 Constantin Moldoveanu went to play for Sportul Studențesc București where on 28 October 1973 he made his last Divizia A appearance in a 2–0 away loss against UTA Arad, having a total of 222 appearances and 59 goals scored in the competition, also he has a total of 16 matches played and 8 goals scored in Cupa României and 9 matches and one goal scored in European competitions (including four games in the Inter-Cities Fairs Cup). He ended his career by playing two seasons in Divizia B, first at Petrolul and then at Prahova Ploiești. On 10 September 2013, Moldoveanu died in the Ploiești County Hospital.

International career
Constantin Moldoveanu played one game for Romania's national team when coach Bazil Marian sent him on the field in order to replace captain Ion Ionescu in the 14th minute of a 1–1 friendly against Uruguay, which took place on 4 January 1967 in Montevideo on Estadio Gran Parque Central.

Managerial career
Constantin Moldoveanu worked as a coach mainly in the Romanian lower leagues, having a few spells in Divizia A at Gloria Buzău and Petrolul Ploiești. He also coached juniors for many years and worked for a while as a football referee.

Honours

Club
Petrolul Ploiești
Divizia A: 1965–66
Cupa României: 1962–63

Individual
Divizia A top scorer: 1970–71

References

External links

Constantin Moldoveanu player profile at Labtof.ro
Constantin Moldoveanu manager profile at Labtof.ro

1943 births
2013 deaths
Romanian footballers
Romania international footballers
Association football forwards
Liga I players
Liga II players
FC Petrolul Ploiești players
FC Steaua București players
FC Politehnica Iași (1945) players
FC Sportul Studențesc București players
Romanian football managers
FC Gloria Buzău managers
FC Petrolul Ploiești managers
CSM Flacăra Moreni managers
CSO Plopeni managers
Romanian football referees
Sportspeople from Ploiești